Guatemala competed at the 1972 Summer Olympics in Munich, West Germany. Eight competitors, all men, took part in ten events in three sports.

Athletics

Men's 5000 metres
Carlos Cuque López
 Heat — 15:53.4 (→ did not advance)

Shooting

One male shooter represented Guatemala in 1972.

25 m pistol
 Víctor Castellanos

Wrestling

References

External links
Official Olympic Reports

Nations at the 1972 Summer Olympics
1972
1972 in Guatemalan sport